The 482d Fighter-Interceptor Squadron is an inactive United States Air Force unit.  Its last assignment was with Montgomery Air Defense Sector at Homestead Air Force Base, Florida in 1969.  During World War II the squadron was a replacement training unit until disbanded in 1944 when the Army Air Forces converted training units to Army Air Force Base Units.  It was reconstituted in 1955 and served as a fighter interceptor squadron until 1969.

History

World War II
Activated in 1943 as a IV Fighter Command P-38 Lightning Replacement Training Unit (RTU). The squadron trained P-38 pilots until March 1944 when it was disbanded as part of the switchover of numbered training units in the Zone of the Interior (ZI) (Continental United States) were replaced by "Army Air Force Base Units". At Grand Central Air Terminal, its parent 473d Fighter Group was replaced by the 402d Army Air Force Base Unit (Replacement Training Unit, Fighter), the personnel and equipment of the 482d Fighter Squadron being designated as "Squadron A".

Cold War
The squadron was redesignated 482d Fighter-Interceptor Squadron in 1955 and reactivated as an Air Defense Command (ADC) interceptor squadron.  It performed the air defense mission over the Mid-Atlantic states with F-102 Delta Daggers.

In April 1961, ADC initiated Operation Southern Tip, deploying six Convair F-102 Delta Dagger aircraft from its test and training unit at Tyndall AFB Florida to Homestead AFB, Florida in a two-week test of a contingency plan to augment air defense forces in Southern Florida in face of the potential threat from an unfriendly Cuba.  Two of the F-102s were maintained on armed five-minute alert status.  However, on 17 April the Bay of Pigs Invasion occurred, and the Joint Chiefs of Staff directed that Southern Tip continue indefinitely.  However, the impact of the extended deployment on the training and testing mission led to the 482d FIS assuming the mission in July with four of its aircraft.  Due to repairs of the Homestead runway, these aircraft were based at Miami International Airport until January 1962.  This commitment was expanded to 18 aircraft on 20 October 1962 during the 1962 Cuban Missile Crisis. As the crisis abated in November, the Homestead defense mission was assumed by the 325th Fighter-Interceptor Squadron.

The 482d resumed its Florida defense mission on 15 June 1963, when it deployed six of its F-102s to Naval Air Station Key West to replace Marine F-4B fighters that had deployed there in 1962.  The 482d was also tasked to maintain the capability to expand its Key West presence to 20 fighters in the event of another Cuban crisis.  This capability was tested in 1964 in Exercise Arawak Spear.

Lineage
 Constituted as the 482d Fighter Squadron on 12 October 1943
 Activated on 1 November 1943
 Disbanded on 31 March 1944
 Reconstituted and redesignated 482d Fighter-Interceptor Squadron in November 1955
 Activated on 8 April 1956
 Inactivated on 1 October 1965

Assignments
 473d Fighter Group, 1 November 1943 – 31 March 1944
 85th Air Division, 8 April 1956
 35th Air Division, 1 September 1958
 32nd Air Division, 15 November 1959
 Washington Air Defense Sector, 1 July 1961
 Montgomery Air Defense Sector, 1 July 1965 – 30 June 1969

Stations
 Grand Central Air Terminal, California, 1 November 1943
 Moses Lake Army Air Field, Washington, 31 March 1944
 Seymour Johnson Air Force Base, North Carolina, 8 April 1956
 Detachment at Homestead Air Force Base, Florida 1 July 1961 - November 1962 (operated from Miami International Airport, Florida, 1 July – 31 December 1961)
 Homestead AFB, Florida, 1 July 1965 – 30 June 1969

Aircraft
 P-38 Lightning, 1944
 P-39 Airacobra, 1944
 F-102 Delta Dagger, 1957–1965

See also

References

Notes

Bibliography

 
 McMullen, Richard F. (1964) The Fighter Interceptor Force 1962-1964, ADC Historical Study No. 27, pp. 5–8 (Confidential, declassified 22 March 2000)
 NORAD/CONAD Participation in the Cuban Missile Crisis, Historical Reference Paper No. 8, Directorate of Command History Continental Air Defense Command, Ent AFB, CO, 1 Feb 63 (Top Secret NOFORN declassified 9 March 1996)

Further reading
 
 USAF Aerospace Defense Command publication, "The Interceptor", January 1979 (Volume 21, Number 1).

482
Military units and formations established in 1955
Aerospace Defense Command units
1955 establishments in the United States